Head start or headstart may refer to:

Headstarting, a technique in nature conservation
Head Start (program), an educational program of the United States Department of Health and Human Services
Head start (positioning), a lead in the position in which one starts
Head Start (TV series), an Australian television drama series that ran for forty episodes on the Australian Broadcasting Corporation in 2001
Operation Head Start, a Cold War operation in which B-52 Stratofortress bombers were launched and placed on rotation off Greenland and Canada
Headstart (web), an Israeli crowdfunding site for entrepreneurs

See also
Law of the handicap of a head start, a theory that suggests that getting an initial head start in a given area may result in being a handicap in the long-term